The following lists events that happened during 1937 in Australia.

Incumbents

Monarch – George VI
Governor-General – Alexander Hore-Ruthven, 1st Earl of Gowrie
Prime Minister – Joseph Lyons
Chief Justice – Sir John Latham

State Premiers
Premier of New South Wales – Bertram Stevens
Premier of Queensland – William Forgan Smith
Premier of South Australia – Richard L. Butler
Premier of Tasmania – Albert Ogilvie
Premier of Victoria – Albert Dunstan
Premier of Western Australia – John Willcock

State Governors
Governor of New South Wales – John Loder, 2nd Baron Wakehurst (from 8 April)
Governor of Queensland – Sir Leslie Orme Wilson
Governor of South Australia – Sir Winston Dugan
Governor of Tasmania – Sir Ernest Clark
Governor of Victoria – William Vanneck, 5th Baron Huntingfield
Governor of Western Australia – none appointed

Events
9 February – Cairns is hit by a tropical cyclone.
15 February – An explosion kills 13 men at the State Coal Mine in Wonthaggi, Victoria.
20 February – A general election is held in Tasmania. The incumbent Labor government led by Albert Ogilvie is returned to power.
1 March – Bernard O'Reilly locates the wreckage of an Airlines of Australia Stinson airliner, VH-UHH City of Brisbane, in the McPherson Range in southern Queensland. Two survivors are rescued, five others did not survive.
 20 April – Regular airmail services begin between Australia and the USA.
 23 October – The ACTU calls on the government to boycott trade with Japan, following the Japanese invasion of China.

Arts and literature

 24 June – The Commonwealth Literature Censorship Board replaces the Book Censorship Advisory Committee, and temporarily lifts the ban on Ulysses by James Joyce.
 Sunbaker by photographer Max Dupain

Sport
3 March – Captained by Don Bradman, Australia defeats England in the Fifth Test at the Melbourne Cricket Ground, retaining The Ashes.
25 September – Geelong become premiers of the 1937 VFL season, defeating Collingwood 18.14 (122) to 12.18 (90).
19 November – Hubert Opperman completes an epic bicycle ride from Fremantle, Western Australia to Sydney, taking 13 days, 10 hours and 11 minutes.
Eastern Suburbs win the premiership in a shortened 1937 NSWRFL season. University finish in last place for the fourth year in a row, and voluntarily withdraw from the premiership at the end of the season.

Births
16 January – Lorraine Bayly, actor
19 January – John Lions, computer scientist and academic (died 1998)
21 January
Peter Gallagher, rugby league footballer (died 2003)
Michael Beahan, Labor Senator for Western Australia (died 2022)
25 January – John Watson, Liberal Senator for Tasmania
4 February – John Devitt, Olympic swimmer
19 February
Lee Harding, science fiction writer
Colin Ridgway, NFL American footballer (died 1993)
20 February – Robert Evans, minister and amateur astronomer
21 February – Ron Clarke, Olympic athlete (died 2015)
3 March – Kevin O'Halloran, Olympic swimmer (died 1976)
7 April – Louise Faulkner, missing woman
13 April – Col Joye, entertainer
19 April – Lindsay Fox, businessman
27 May – Peter Pinne, writer and composer
1 June – Colleen McCullough, novelist (died 2015)
11 June – Robin Warren, Nobel Prize-winning pathologist
7 July Jocelyn Newman, politician (died 2018)
26 July
Alan Cadman, politician
Guy Green, Governor of Tasmania (1995–2003)
28 August – Tony Marchant, Olympic track cyclist
1 September – Ian Callinan, High Court judge
4 September – Dawn Fraser, Olympic swimmer
17 September – Gary Chapman, Olympic swimmer (died 1978)
18 September – Barry Muir, rugby league footballer
3 October – John Hodges, Minister for Immigration (1982–1983)
7 October – Colin Guest, cricketer (died 2018)
10 October – Bruce Devlin, golfer
21 November – John Kerin, politician
12 December
Michael Jeffery, Governor-General of Australia (died 2020)
Judy Tegart, tennis player
17 December – Kerry Packer, businessman (died 2005)

Deaths

 11 February – Walter Burley Griffin, architect of Canberra (born in the United States and died in India) (b. 1876)
 18 March – Walter Wilson Froggatt, geologist and economic entomologist (b. 1858)
 7 May – Christina Jane Corrie, Queensland politician and suffragette (born in the United Kingdom) (b. 1867)
 9 June – Charles Chewings, geologist and anthropologist (b. 1859)
 10 July – Thomas Brentnall, accountant and musician (born in the United Kingdom) (b. 1846)
 22 July – Ted McDonald, cricketer and Australian rules footballer (Essendon, Fitzroy) (died in the United Kingdom) (b. 1891)
 28 July – Sir George Hyde, 7th Naval Member and Chief of the Australian Naval Staff (born in the United Kingdom) (b. 1877)
 14 August – Bruce Smith, New South Wales politician (born in the United Kingdom) (b. 1851)
 28 August – George Prendergast, 28th Premier of Victoria (b. 1854)
 28 September – William Ramsay Smith, physician and anthropologist (born in the United Kingdom) (b. 1859)
 2 October – Sir Granville Ryrie, New South Wales politician, diplomat and soldier (b. 1865)
 8 October – Dame Eadith Walker, philanthropist and heiress (b. 1861)
 4 November – Alfred Walter Campbell, neurologist (b. 1868)
 6 November – William Moore, art and drama critic (b. 1868)
 17 November – Jack Worrall, cricketer and Australian rules footballer (Fitzroy) (b. 1861)
 19 November – Rayner Hoff, sculptor (born in the United Kingdom) (b. 1894)
 27 November – Walter Howchin, geologist (born in the United Kingdom) (b. 1845)
 11 December – Godfrey Irving, 8th Chief of the General Staff (b. 1867)
 16 December – Sir Murray Bourchier, 5th Deputy Premier of Victoria and soldier (died in the United Kingdom) (b. 1881)

See also
 List of Australian films of the 1930s

References

 
Australia
Years of the 20th century in Australia